Compact is an American online magazine that began operating in March 2022. The magazine was co-founded by Marxist populist Edwin Aponte, former editor of the conservative ecumenical journal First Things, Matthew Schmitz, and conservative opinion journalist Sohrab Ahmari. The New York Times describes the magazine's editors as being ideologically diverse, including religiously conservative Catholics, populists and dissident Marxist feminists. The magazine's editorial line is critical of liberalism from both the left and the right.

Planning for the launch of the magazine began in 2020 between Ahmari and Schmitz, who later incorporated Aponte on the condition that half of the site's content cover "material concerns". Compact launched without a paywall for its first few weeks and is now run on a reader-funded model, requiring a paid subscription to access all of the articles on the site.

The magazine includes columnists such as Christopher Caldwell, Lee Smith, Malcom Kyeyune, and Nina Power, and contributing editors including Adrian Vermeule, Glenn Greenwald, Liel Leibovitz, Michael Tracey, Patrick Deneen, Paul Embery, and Slavoj Žižek.

Co-founder Edwin Aponte exited the magazine over political differences after the Dobbs v. Jackson Women's Health Organization U.S. Supreme Court decision was leaked to the public.

References

External links

Online magazines published in the United States
English-language magazines
Magazines established in 2022